Dibromooctane may refer to:

 , a double brominated aliphatic compound
 1,8-Dibromooctane, compound used in the synthesis of carbamate nerve agents

Bromoalkanes